The 2021 Northern Mystics season saw Northern Mystics compete in the 2021 ANZ Premiership. With a team coached by Helene Wilson, captained by Sulu Fitzpatrick and featuring Ama Agbeze, Bailey Mes and Grace Nweke, Mystics won their first ever premiership. After finishing the regular season as minor premiers, they defeated Mainland Tactix 61–59 in the grand final.

Players

Player movements

Roster

Pre-season

Otaki tournament
Northern Mystics participated in the official ANZ Premiership tournament at Te Wānanga o Raukawa in Otaki between 26 and 28 March. All six ANZ Premiership teams took part.

Regular season

Fixtures and results
Round 1

Round 2

Round 3

Round 4

Round 5

Round 6

Round 7

Round 8 

Round 9

Round 10 

Round 11

Round 12

Round 13 

Round 14

Round 15

Final standings

Finals series

Grand final

Award winners

New Zealand Netball Awards

ANZ Premiership Awards

Mystics Awards

Northern Marvels
In 2021 Northern Marvels, the Mystics reserve team, were National Netball League premiers, defeating Northern Comets 64–56 in the grand final at The Trusts Arena. Mystics players Claire O'Brien, Filda Vui and Saviour Tui all regularly played for Marvels during the NNL season. Tui was named the NNL's 2021 Player of the Year.

References

2021
2021 ANZ Premiership season
2021 in New Zealand netball